Events from the year 1937 in Denmark.

Incumbents
 Monarch – Christian X
 Prime minister – Thorvald Stauning

Events
 18 May – The state national police force Rigspolitiet – under command of one chief of police – begins operations.
 26 September  The Storstrøm Bridge is inaugurated.
 14 December – Many documents from the National Archives of Denmark, the Royal Danish Library and Copenhagen University Library relating to Norwegian conditions are transferred to Norway.

Sports

Cycling
 2129 August  The 1937 UCI Track Cycling World Championships are held in Copenhagen.
 Kees Pellenaars (NED) and  Frans Slaats (NED) win the Six Days of Copenhagen sox-day track cycling race.

Football
 AB wins their third Danish football championship by winning the 1936–37 Danish Championship League.

Births
 14 January – Erland Kops, badminton player (died 2017)
 14 June – Jørgen Leth, film director, writer, poet

Deaths
 8 February – Martin Borch, architect (born 1852)
 22 March – Thorvald Aagaard, composer (born 1877)
 23 March – Helge Rode, writer, critic and journalist (born 1870)
 30 December – Hans Niels Andersen, businessman, founder of East Asiatic Company (born 1852)

References

 
Denmark
Years of the 20th century in Denmark
1930s in Denmark
1937 in Europe